The Oniani – is a Georgian family name from the Svaneti region in the north-western Georgia.

The Oniani family name comes from these towns of Svaneti: Gulida, Durashi, Zeskho, Tekali, Lakhamula, Lekosandi, Lemzagori, Lentekhi, Lenjeri, Luji, Mami, Mebetsi, Mele, Mestia, Mulakhi, Mutsdi, Natsuli, Jakhunderi, Rtskhmeluri, Sasashi, Sakdari, Tvibi, Panaga, Karishi, Kvedreshi, Shkedi, Chikhareshi, Chukuli, Tchvelpi, Khaishi and Khophuri.

Notable members 
Tariel Oniani
Giorgi Oniani
Roin Oniani

References 

Georgian-language surnames